Milko Georgiev Kazanov (sometimes listed as Milko Kazakov, born 11 February 1970 in Rousse) is a Bulgarian sprint canoeist who competed from the early 1990s to 2005. Competing in four Summer Olympics, he won a bronze medal in the K-2 1000 m event at Atlanta in 1996.

Kazanov also won a bronze in the K-4 1000 m event at the 2002 ICF Canoe Sprint World Championships in Seville.

He has also won three European Championship medals, two silvers (K-4 500 m, K-4 1000 m) in Zagreb in 1999 and bronze (K-4 1000 m) in Poznań in 2000.

He is now a member of the Levski Canoe/Kayak Club in Sofia.

References

External links
 

1970 births
Bulgarian male canoeists
Sportspeople from Ruse, Bulgaria
Canoeists at the 1992 Summer Olympics
Canoeists at the 1996 Summer Olympics
Canoeists at the 2000 Summer Olympics
Canoeists at the 2004 Summer Olympics
Living people
Olympic canoeists of Bulgaria
Olympic bronze medalists for Bulgaria
Olympic medalists in canoeing
ICF Canoe Sprint World Championships medalists in kayak
Medalists at the 1996 Summer Olympics